The Global Times is a daily tabloid newspaper under the auspices of the Chinese Communist Party's flagship newspaper, the People's Daily, commenting on international issues from a Chinese ultra-nationalistic perspective. The publication is sometimes called  "China's Fox News" for its propagandistic slant and the monetization of nationalism.

Established as a publication in 1993, its English version was launched in 2009. The editor-in-chief of Global Times was Hu Xijin until December 2021, who has been described as an early adopter of the "wolf warrior" communication strategy of loudly denouncing perceived criticism of the Chinese government and its policies. The newspaper has been the source of various incidents, including fabrications, conspiracy theories, and disinformation. It is part of a broader set of Chinese state media outlets that constitute the Chinese government's propaganda apparatus.

History
Established as a Chinese-language weekly publication in 1993, an English-language version was launched on 20 April 2009 as part of a Chinese government campaign to compete with overseas media.

In 2009, Hu Xijin, the editor-in-chief of both Chinese and English versions at the time, stated that he expected it to make a loss of 20 million yuan in its first year as an English-language publication. In 2016, Hu said the Global Times was profitable but faced difficulties that would be familiar to other newspaper editors.

The Global Times launched its US edition in 2013. In 2016, it was reported that the English-language edition then had approximately 20 "foreign experts" who were involved with assigning stories and copyediting, "as long as the coverage [wa]s not about politics".

In 2019, the Global Times won a three-year contract with the Foreign Minister of the People's Republic of China to monitor overseas social media and provide regular briefings and "comprehensive response plans."

In December 2021, Hu Xijin announced that he would be stepping down as editor-in-chief.

Editorial stance
The Chinese-language version has been known to have a pro-Chinese Communist Party (CCP) slant, attracting a nationalistic readership since its inception in 1993. When launched in 2009, its editors claimed that the Global Times' English-language version took a less nationalistic stance than its Chinese-language counterpart.

Sources both in mainland China and abroad have said that the Global Times is not generally representative of the Chinese government's political positions, while the People's Daily is considered more representative. Others have stated that the Global Times' editorial stance has been viewed as channeling the views of the hardline faction of top leadership. Some scholars have noted that Global Times' more nationalistic stance permits other official state-run media to appear more moderate in tone.

The newspaper's former editor Hu Xijin has been described as an early adopter of the "wolf warrior" communication strategy of aggressively hitting back at criticism of the Chinese government. His departure in December 2021, reportedly due to Beijing "strengthening the paper’s political guidance", was (according to The Diplomat) connected to efforts of toning down overly confrontational rhetoric, following a deterioration of China's international reputation and CCP general secretary Xi Jinping calling for improvements in the country's international communication at a May 2021 CCP Political Bureau session.

Australia
In 2016, the Global Times referred to Australia as a "paper cat" in relation to the South China Sea, and a former "offshore prison" in relation to an Olympic champion Mack Horton calling out rival Sun Yang as a drug cheat (in reference to the country's former status as a British penal colony).

Hong Kong 
In May 2016, the Global Times ran a boycott campaign denigrating Hong Kong pro-democracy singer Denise Ho for allegedly advocating independence for Hong Kong and Tibet. On 5 June, Lancôme cancelled a promotional concert by the Cantopop star that was scheduled to be held on 19 June in Sheung Wan. Lancôme also added, in a Facebook post, that Ho was not a spokesperson for the brand. The Tibet allegation appeared to have stemmed from Ho's May 2016 meeting with the Dalai Lama. The cancellation drew a heavy backlash in Hong Kong. Some Lancôme shops in Hong Kong were shut down during the protests. Listerine, another brand that Ho represents, retained the singer despite the fact that the Global Times also criticized that company hiring Ho as its public face in Hong Kong.

In August 2019, Global Times editor Hu Xijin accused the United States of instigating the Hong Kong pro-democracy protests.

Incidents

COVID-19 disinformation 

The Global Times has spread unfounded conspiracy theories and disinformation related to the COVID-19 pandemic. In January 2021, the Global Times urged Australia not to use the Pfizer–BioNTech COVID-19 vaccine. In March 2022, the Global Times republished an article by the British conspiracist website The Exposé which falsely claimed COVID-19 was created by Moderna.

Astroturfing allegations 
Richard Burger, a former editor at Global Times, alleges that in the wake of the 2011 arrest of Ai Weiwei, the Chinese staff of the Global Times were ordered by the Chinese Communist Party to conduct an "astroturfing" campaign against "maverick" Ai Weiwei.

Fabricated quotes 
In October 2015, Roderick MacFarquhar, a China expert at Harvard University, spoke at a conference on Marxism in Beijing. He said that Chinese leader Xi Jinpings talk of the so-called Chinese Dream was "not the intellectually coherent, robust and wide-ranging philosophy needed to stand up to Western ideas." The Global Times reported his speech as saying that the "Chinese Dream" would "make great contributions and exert a positive impact on human development." MacFarquhar said that the paraphrasing was a "total fabrication". The line was later removed by the newspaper from its story.

Xinjiang

In 2018, the English edition of the Global Times acknowledged "counter-terrorism education" in Xinjiang, even as Chinese spokespeople denied the existence of the Xinjiang internment camps. The Economist noted: "Strikingly, rather than claiming that Western journalists misreport Xinjiang, the Global Times prefers to troll them, accusing foreign correspondents of hoping to 'profit' from negative China coverage, while asserting that the Western press is 'nowhere near as influential as it once was' and gleefully noting Mr Trump's attacks on 'fake news'."

In 2019, the Global Times was criticized for perceived bias in its portrayal of Uyghurs and of disinformation campaigns regarding the Xinjiang internment camps, which led Twitter to ban it and other state-sponsored media outlets from ad purchases. In 2021, ProPublica and The New York Times reported that Global Times was part of a coordinated state campaign to deny human rights abuses in Xinjiang. In June 2021, when the Uyghur Tribunal was taking place, the Global Times published an article that Coda Media described as "seem[ing] to be arguing that Britain is a land of nonsense contradictions anyway."

"Final solution" tweet 
In October 2021, a tweet from the Global Times which called for a "Final Solution to the Taiwan Question" was condemned by German politician Frank Müller-Rosentritt of the Free Democratic Party for its similarity to the "Final Solution to the Jewish Question" which resulted in the Holocaust.

2022 Russian invasion of Ukraine 

In March 2022, during the 2022 Russian invasion of Ukraine, the Global Times promoted unsubstantiated Russian claims of biological weapons labs in Ukraine. The Global Times also echoed Russian state media claims that the Bucha massacre was staged.

In May 2022, the Global Times said that a Canadian sniper who volunteered to fight in defense of Ukraine had "accused the Ukrainian army of inadequate weaponry, poor training, heavy losses, profiteering and desertion", citing a report by Russian state media outlet RT. The fact-checking website Polygraph.info found that RT and the Global Times had cherry-picked a report published by the Canadian newspaper La Presse to make the claim.

On 23 June 2022, Global Times tweeted a claim that thousands of protesters marched in Brussels condemning NATO's aid for Ukraine during the Russian invasion of Ukraine on June 20. However, the protest was aimed at inflation as well as high costs of living; no evidence was found that it was linked to NATO. Samuel Cogolati, a member of parliament in Belgium, condemned the claim as disinformation.

Reception

In China 
In May 2016, the Global Times was criticized domestically by the Cyberspace Administration of China for "fabricating" news on the US, the South China Sea, North Korea, and Hong Kong, and "disturbing" the order of the cyberspace.

In 2016, a retired Chinese ambassador compared the Global Times to an angry toddler. Xiang Lanxin, a former Global Times columnist who left due to its nationalism, wrote that it would be a "great shame" if history equated the Global Times with Der Stürmer, a Nazi propaganda tabloid.

In September 2018, The Economist wrote: "It is not fashionable in China to take the Global Times seriously. Mention it at dinner with Chinese intellectuals and fireworks follow. They deplore its sabre-rattling towards Taiwan and Japan, and its deep reservoirs of grievance (this week the paper peddled a largely confected tale accusing Swedish police of brutalising some rowdy Chinese tourists)."

In India 
In September 2020, India's Ministry of External Affairs issued a statement saying that comments made by the Global Times were falsely attributed to Ajit Doval.

In Singapore 
In September 2016, the Global Times published an article, titled "Singapore's Delusional Reference to the South China Sea Arbitration During the Non-Aligned Movement Summit". Stanley Loh Ka Leung, then Singapore's ambassador to China, criticized the article as fake news. Loh also asked the Global Times to publish in full, in both English and Chinese, a letter he wrote to the newspaper's then editor-in-chief, Hu Xijin. Hu refuted the ambassador by saying that the Global Times reports were reliable and based on information from people who attended the meeting, without publishing the letter that Loh had requested to be published.

In the United States 
In June 2020, the United States Department of State designated Global Times as a foreign mission.

In February 2023, the US-China Business Council (USCBC) released a statement refuting a Global Times article that claimed USCBC representatives had criticized the US Ambassador to China, Nicholas Burns. The USCBC said that the claims in the report were false and expressed appreciation for Burns' work in Beijing.

See also

 List of newspapers in China
 Mass media in China

Notes

References

External links
  (in English)
 Huanqiu Online (in Chinese)

People's Daily
Chinese-language newspapers (Simplified Chinese)
Communist newspapers
English-language newspapers published in China
Publications established in 1993
Publications established in 2009
Chinese Communist Party newspapers
Chinese propaganda organisations
Daily newspapers published in China
Disinformation operations
Conspiracist media
Uyghur genocide denial
Anti-American sentiment in China